Jaroslav Bogdálek (24 May 1929 – 7 December 2022) was a Czech alpine skier. He competed in three events at the 1956 Winter Olympics.

References

1929 births
2022 deaths
Czech male alpine skiers
Olympic alpine skiers of Czechoslovakia
Alpine skiers at the 1956 Winter Olympics
Sportspeople from Brno